Chengyu Expressway is the first thruway from Chengdu to Chongqing, which was finished in 1995. The whole distance is about 340.2 kilometers, and between Wuguiqiao of Chengdu and Chenjiaping of Chongqing. It's now part of G76 Xiamen–Chengdu Expressway and G85 Yinchuan–Kunming Expressway.

References 

Transport in Chongqing
Transport in Chengdu
Expressways in Sichuan
1995 establishments in China